Vous êtes jeunes vous êtes beaux is a French drama directed by Franchin Don.

Plot
Lucius Marnant is a retiree who feels that his life is three quarters behind him. Returning from a funeral, Lucius meets Lahire a young man who offers him to improve his daily life by participating in clandestine fights between old men. Very quickly Lucius takes a liking to this new life, to money and forgetting oneself and death.

Cast
 Gérard Darmon: Lucius Marnant
 Josiane Balasko: Mona
 Vincent Winterhalter: Lahire
 Patrick Bouchitey: Aldo
 Denis Lavant: Monsieur Loyal
 Victor Belmondo: Alexandre
 Cyrille Eldin: Costa
 Marie Sambourg: Sarah

Production
Principal photography on the film began on January 22, 2018 and lasted until March 2, 2018 in Colombes, Asnières-sur-Seine and Villeneuve-la-Garenne.

References

External links

2018 films
French drama films
2010s French-language films
2018 drama films
2010s French films